With All My Heart is an album by jazz drummer Harvey Mason. It was released by Bluebird Records.

Music and recording
Mason plays on each of the album's 11 tracks with a different combination of pianist and bassist.

Reception

The AllAboutJazz reviewer commented on the inevitable lack of tightness in some of the band performances, given a likely lack of rehearsal time, but summarized that "this is a very solid, solid outing". Herbie Hancock won the Best Jazz Instrumental Solo Grammy for "Speak Like a Child".

Track listing and personnel
Harvey Mason (drums) plays on every track.

References

2004 albums
Jazz albums by American artists